Bankeryd is the second largest locality  situated in Jönköping Municipality, Jönköping County, Sweden with 8,107 inhabitants in 2010.

Bankeryd is situated on the western shore of the lake Vättern about 7 km north of the municipal city Jönköping. It is mainly residential with some industries, and could be considered a suburb of Jönköping.

References

External links

Populated places in Jönköping Municipality